UPN44 may refer to one of the following television stations in the United States formerly affiliated with UPN:

WTOG, St. Petersburg/Tampa, Florida, now affiliated with The CW Television Network (O&O)
KBCW, San Francisco, California, now affiliated with The CW Television Network (O&O)
Miami Valley Channel, Dayton, Ohio, a now-defunct cable-only station operated by CBS affiliate WHIO-TV